Dame Elaine Inglesby-Burke  is a British nurse. She was the Group Chief Nursing Officer at Salford Royal Hospital and the Northern Care Alliance NHS Group till 2019.

Career 
Born in Orford, Elaine trained at Warrington General from 1977 to 1980 and qualified as a Registered Nurse in 1980. She came to Salford Royal as Chief Nurse in 2004 and later held the positions of Executive Nurse Director and Deputy Chief Executive, at Salford Royal NHS Foundation Trust. She also worked on The Pennine Acute Hospitals NHS Trust.

She was a member of the Nursing and Care Quality Forum and was part of the Berwick National Advisory Group of the Safety of Patients in England. In 2016, She became the non-executive director of the National Institute of Care and Excellence.

Awards 
In 2015, she was appointed a Commander of the Order of the British Empire for services to nursing in the 2015. In 2019, Elaine became the first national recipient of NHS England's Chief Nursing Officers Gold Award. In October 2020, she was promoted to a Dame Commander of the Order of the British Empire in the 2020 Queen's Birthday Honours.

References 

Year of birth missing (living people)
Living people
British women nurses
British nursing administrators
Dames Commander of the Order of the British Empire